The 1020s was a decade of the Julian Calendar which began on January 1, 1020, and ended on December 31, 1029.

Significant people
 Al-Qadir caliph of Baghdad
 Al-Hakim bi-Amr Allah caliph of Cairo
 Henry I of France
 Avicenna

References